Carry On Dick is a 1974 British comedy film, the 26th release in the series of 31 Carry On films (1958–1992). The story is based on the Dick Turpin legend and features Turpin (James) as an antihero, attempting to evade capture by the authorities.

Carry On Dick was released in July 1974 and marked the end of an era for the series. It features the last appearances of Sid James (after nineteen appearances in the series), Hattie Jacques (fourteen appearances) and Barbara Windsor (nine appearances), although all three would appear in the Carry On Laughing TV series and Windsor would co-present a film compilation, That's Carry On!. It was the first of two Carry On appearances for Sam Kelly and the final Carry On film for Margaret Nolan (six appearances) and Bill Maynard (five appearances). It was the 20th and final Carry On to be scripted by Talbot Rothwell. Other regulars in Carry On Dick were Kenneth Williams, Bernard Bresslaw, Joan Sims, Kenneth Connor, Peter Butterworth and Jack Douglas.

Plot
In the year 1750, England is rife with crime and highway robbers. To stop the wave of chaos, King George II sets up the first professional police force named the Bow Street Runners, under the command of the bellowing Sir Roger Daley (Bernard Bresslaw), and seconded by Captain Desmond Fancey (Kenneth Williams) and Sergeant Jock Strapp (Jack Douglas). The Runners are apparently successful in wiping out crime and lawlessness – using all manner of traps and tricks to round the criminals up. However their main target is the notorious Richard "Big Dick" Turpin (Sid James), a highwayman who has evaded capture and succeeded in even robbing Sir Roger and his prim wife (Margaret Nolan) of their money and clothing. After this humiliation, Turpin becomes the Bow Street Runners' most wanted man, and thus Captain Fancey is assigned to go undercover and catch the famous Dick Turpin and bring him to justice.

The Bow Street Runners nearly succeed in apprehending Turpin and his two partners in crime, Harriet (Barbara Windsor) and Tom (Peter Butterworth), one evening as they hold up a coach carrying faux-French show-woman, Madame Desiree (Joan Sims), and her unladylike daughters, "The Birds of Paradise." However, Turpin manages to outsmart the Runners, sending them away in Madam Desiree's coach.

Outraged by Strapp's incompetence, Captain Fancey travels with the sergeant to the village of Upper Dencher near to where the majority of Turpin's hold-ups are carried out. There they encounter the mild-mannered Reverend Flasher, who is really Turpin in disguise, with Tom as his church assistant and Harriet as his maidservant. They confide in the rector their true identities and their scheme to apprehend Turpin. They agree to meet at the seedy Old Cock Inn, a notorious hang-out for criminals and sleazy types, and where Desiree and her showgirls are performing. Fancey and Strapp pose as two on-the-run crooks – and Strapp dubs his superior "Dandy Desmond" – and they hear from the greasy old hag, Maggie (Marianne Stone), a midwife who removed buckshot from Turpin's buttock, that Turpin has a curious birthmark on his manhood. Strapp wastes no time in carrying out an inspection in the public convenience of the Old Cock Inn.

When the rector arrives, he discovers their knowledge of the birthmark, and sweet talks Desiree into assisting him with the capture of "Turpin", whom the rector has told Desiree is actually Fancey, who is sitting downstairs in the bar. She lures him to her room and attempts to undress him, with the help of her wild daughters. The girls pull down his breeches but fail to find an incriminating birthmark, and Desmond staggers half-undressed into the bar. Strapp is also dumped into a horse trough for peeping at the men in the toilets.

Strapp and Fancey send a message to Sir Roger about the birthmark, and are accosted by Harriet in disguise who tells them to meet Turpin that night at ten o'clock. Meanwhile, Tom tells the local constable that he knows where Turpin will be that night – at the location Harriet told Strapp and Fancey to wait. Thus, they are imprisoned as Turpin and his mate, and Sir Roger is yet again robbed on his way to see the prisoners.

However things fall apart when the rector's housekeeper, Martha Hoggett (Hattie Jacques) begins to put two and two together when Mrs Giles (Patsy Rowlands), apparently sick and used for a cover-up story for Dick's raids, is seen fit and well at the church jumble sale. Later that day, Harriet is caught at the Old Cock Inn where Fancey, Strapp and Daley are meeting and Fancey recognises her as the "man" who conned them into being caught. She is chased into Desiree's room and is told to undress to show the infamous birthmark. However, they soon realise she is a woman and are prepared to let her go, but lock her up after Lady Daley recognises a bracelet that Harriet is wearing as one Turpin stole from her.

With the net tightening, the Reverend Flasher gives an elongated sermon before outwitting his would-be captors and making a speedy getaway, with Harriett and Tom, across the border.

Cast

Sid James as The Reverend Flasher/Dick Turpin
Kenneth Williams as Captain Desmond Fancey
Barbara Windsor as Harriett
Hattie Jacques as Martha Hoggett
Bernard Bresslaw as Sir Roger Daley
Joan Sims as Madame Desiree
Peter Butterworth as Tom
Kenneth Connor as Constable
Jack Douglas as Sergeant Jock Strapp
Patsy Rowlands as Mrs Giles
Bill Maynard as Bodkin
Margaret Nolan as Lady Daley
John Clive as Isaak
David Lodge as Bullock
Marianne Stone as Maggie
Patrick Durkin as William
Sam Kelly as Sir Roger's coachman
George Moon as Mr Giles
Michael Nightingale as Squire Trelawney
Brian Osborne as Browning
Anthony Bailey as Rider
Brian Coburn as Highwayman
Max Faulkner as Highwayman
Jeremy Connor as Footpad
Nosher Powell as Footpad
Joy Harington as Lady
Larry Taylor as Tough man
Billy Cornelius as Tough man
Laraine Humphrys as Bird of Paradise
Linda Hooks as Bird of Paradise
Penny Irving as Bird of Paradise
Eva Reuber-Staier as Bird of Paradise

Crew
Screenplay – Talbot Rothwell
Treatment – Lawrie Wyman & George Evans
Music – Eric Rogers
Production Manager – Roy Goddard
Art Director – Lionel Couch
Editor – Alfred Roome
Director of Photography – Ernest Steward
Camera Operator – Jimmy Devis
Continuity – Jane Buck
Assistant Director – David Bracknell
Sound Recordists – Danny Daniel & Ken Barker
Make-up – Geoffrey Rodway
Hairdresser – Stella Rivers
Costume Design – Courtenay Elliott
Set Dresser – Charles Bishop
Dubbing Editor – Peter Best
Horse Master – Gerry Wain
Assistant Editor – Jack Gardner
Casting Director – John Owen
Stills Cameraman – Tom Cadman
Wardrobe Mistresses – Vi Murray & Maggie Lewin
Coach & Horses – George Mossman
Titles – GSE Ltd
Processor – Rank Film Laboratories
Producer – Peter Rogers
Director – Gerald Thomas

Filming and locations

Filming dates – 4 March-11 April 1974

Interiors:
 Pinewood Studios, Buckinghamshire

Exteriors:
 Countryside and woodland near Pinewood Studios at Black Park, Iver Heath, Buckinghamshire
 The Jolly Woodman Pub, Iver Heath, Buckinghamshire
 Stoke Poges Manor, Stoke Poges, Buckinghamshire
 St Mary's Church, Burnham, Buckinghamshire

Bibliography

Keeping the British End Up: Four Decades of Saucy Cinema by Simon Sheridan (third edition) (2007) (Reynolds & Hearn Books)

External links

Carry On Dick at The Whippit Inn

'

1974 films
1970s historical comedy films
British crime comedy films
British historical comedy films
British parody films
1970s English-language films
Dick
Films shot at Pinewood Studios
Films set in England
Films set in the 1750s
Films directed by Gerald Thomas
Films with screenplays by Talbot Rothwell
Films produced by Peter Rogers
Cultural depictions of Dick Turpin
1970s parody films
1970s crime comedy films
1974 comedy films
Films about highwaymen
1970s British films